Jean Spies (born 27 November 1989) is a South African professional racing cyclist. He rode in the men's scratch event at the 2016 UCI Track Cycling World Championships.

In June 2021, he qualified to represent South Africa at the 2020 Summer Olympics.

References

External links
 

1989 births
Living people
South African male cyclists
Place of birth missing (living people)
South African track cyclists
Cyclists at the 2020 Summer Olympics
Olympic cyclists of South Africa